All the Way is the fifth studio album by American singer Brenda Lee. The album was released August 7, 1961, on Decca Records and was produced by Owen Bradley. It was the second of two studio albums released by Brenda Lee in 1961 and spawned the single "Dum Dum", which became a Top 10 hit on the Billboard Hot 100, and a UK single (not released as a single in the US) "Speak to Me Pretty", which reached No.3 on the UK singles chart (which was the highest placing Lee ever achieved with a single in the UK).

Background and content 
All the Way was recorded in four separate recording sessions at the Bradley Film and Recording Studio, beginning on August 16, 1960, and ending on May 21, 1961. The album contained twelve tracks of material, seven of which were cover versions of previously recorded songs. The album's cover versions included "Kansas City", first recorded by Little Willie Littlefield. It also included a cover version of Ray Charles's "Talkin' About You" and "On the Sunny Side of the Street". Songwriter Ronnie Self, who had previously written other songs by Lee, co-wrote the song "Eventually" for the album. Allmusic'''s Richie Unterberger praised the album's production, calling it a "pretty good record" and "certainly well produced". Overall, Unterberger gave the album three and a half out of five stars, explaining that while he felt the album was "pretty good", he said that it seemed to "showcase versatility", like "many albums of its time". Unterberger commented, "It seems a little strange to apply the adjective "overlooked" to a singer as popular as Lee was at this time, but the album, like so much of her early-'60s work, is further evidence of her underrated skills as a rock and pop singer. And it was appreciated by listeners at the time, the album making the Top 20, even if most of the songs are unfamiliar today even to many Brenda Lee fans." All the Way was released originally as an LP record, containing six songs on each side of the record. The album was reissued on a compact disc in both the United Kingdom and Russia.

 Release All the Way's lead single was "Dum Dum". The song became Lee's seventh consecutive Top 10 hit on the Billboard Hot 100, peaking at #4, while also reaching #22 on the UK Singles Chart. The single's B-side "Eventually" also gained significant radio airplay and peaked at #56 on the Billboard Hot 100 around the same time of the single's release to radio. All the Way was officially released on August 7, 1961, on Decca Records and peaked at #17 on the Billboard 200 albums chart, her first album that year to peak within the Billboard'' 200 Top 20. The album also became Lee's first album to chart in the United Kingdom, peaking at #20 on the UK Albums Chart.

Track listing 
Side one
 "Lover Come Back to Me" (Oscar Hammerstein, Sigmund Romberg) – 2:32
 "All the Way" (Sammy Cahn, Jimmy Van Heusen) – 3:00
 "Dum Dum" (Jackie DeShannon, Sharon Sheeley) – 2:22
 "On the Sunny Side of the Street" (Dorothy Fields, Jimmy McHugh) – 3:16
 "Talkin' 'Bout You" (Ray Charles) – 2:34
 "The Prisoner's Song" (Guy Massey) – 2:40

Side two
 "Do I Worry (Yes I Do)" (Jerry Lordan) – 2:04
 "Tragedy" (Fred Burch, Gerald Nelson) – 2:42
 "Kansas City" (Jerry Leiber, Mike Stoller) – 2:35
 "Eventually" (Dub Albritten, Ronnie Self) – 2:58
 "Speak to Me Pretty" (By Dunham, Henry Vars) – 2:13
 "Big Chance" (Burch, Nelson) – 2:12

Personnel 
 Brenton Banks – strings
 Harold Bradley – guitar
 Howard Carpenter – strings
 Floyd Cramer – piano
 Dottie Dillard – background vocals
 Ray Edenton – guitar
 Buddy Emmons – steel guitar
 Buddy Harman – drums
 Lillian Hunt – strings
 Anita Kerr – background vocals
 Douglas Kirkham – drums
 Brenda Lee – lead vocals
 Grady Martin – guitar
 Louis Nunley – background vocals
 Boots Randolph – saxophone
 Vernel Richardson – strings
 Gil Wright – background vocals
 Joe Zinkan – bass

Sales chart positions 
Album

Singles

References 

1961 albums
Brenda Lee albums
Albums produced by Owen Bradley
Decca Records albums